Thiemo de Bakker was the defending champion but chose to compete in Cincinnati Masters instead. Albert Ramos-Viñolas won in the final defeating Benoît Paire 6–4, 6–2.

Seeds

Draw

Finals

Top half

Bottom half

References
Main Draw
Qualifying Singles

Singles